The terms cut off saw, cutoff saw, or chop saw can refer to two distinct classes of power tools.

 A miter saw, typically used in woodworking
 An abrasive saw, typically used to cut hard materials, such as metals or ceramics